Masruq ibn al-Ajda' (Arabic , died 682) was a well-known and respected tabi'i (from taba'een), jurist and muĥaddith (transmitter of Prophetic traditions or hadith). Chiefly a resident of Kufa (Iraq) he was among the many students of Abdullah ibn Mas'ud. Masruq would later become a popular teacher in his own right, including future Islamic scholars, such as Ibrahim al-Nakha'i and others as his pupils. He is said to have fought on the side of caliph Ali ibn Abi Talib (died 661) against the Kharijites in 658.

Al-Dhahabi included Masruq in his book Siyar A'lam al-Nubala among those who are to be imitated (al-muqalladûn) in character and ibadah by following Muslim generations. It is said that Masruq worshipped Allah very earnestly and that he used to sleep in sajdah (prostration) before the Kaaba. When people suggested him repose in his last illness, he answered: ‘I swear by God that if someone appeared and told me that God would not punish me at all, still I would continue to pray to Him with the same earnestness as before.’

Notes

682 deaths
Tabi‘un
Year of birth unknown
7th-century Arabs
Tabi‘un hadith narrators